Indian Creek is a train station in unincorporated DeKalb County, Georgia, the eastern terminus of the Blue Line of the Metropolitan Atlanta Rapid Transit Authority (MARTA) rail system. It has an island platform with one track on each side of the platform. This station opened in June 1993.

As the eastern terminus for the Blue Line, it primarily serves commuters who take advantage of the free daily parking and ride into the city of Atlanta. Located just outside "The Perimeter" Interstate 285, it mainly serves the City of Lithonia, The newly incorporated City of Stonecrest, as well as communities in: The City of Stone Mountain, and unincorporated communities in: Redan, Stone Mountain and Decatur. Bus service is provided at this station to: The City of Lithonia, The Mall at Stonecrest, Goldsmith Park & Ride, East Dekalb Health Center, Emory-Hillandale Hospital, East Lake Golf Course, Georgia State University, The Beltline and The City of Stone Mountain.

Station layout

Bus Service
The station is served by the following MARTA bus routes:

East Bus Bays
 Route 24 - McAfee / Hosea Williams Drive / East Lake
 Route 111 - Snapfinger Woods Drive / South Hairston Rd / Stonecrest mall
 Route 116 - Redan Road / Stonecrest Mall
 Route 119 - Hairston Road / Stone Mountain Village

West Bus Bays
 Route 107 - Glenwood Road.

Proposed Gwinnett County Transit Service
 Indian Creek is proposed to be the western terminus of Gwinnett County Transit's Route 70/BRT Route 702 to Snellville. Service is reliant on a sales tax referendum in Gwinnett County passing in the future.

References

External links 

MARTA station page

Blue Line (MARTA)
Metropolitan Atlanta Rapid Transit Authority stations
Railway stations in DeKalb County, Georgia
Railway stations in the United States opened in 1993
1993 establishments in Georgia (U.S. state)